The Platinum & Gold Collection is part of Arista Records' Platinum & Gold Collection.  Recorded between 1966 & 1969, this compilation serves as a primer for both the early years of Jefferson Airplane and the golden age of psychedelic rock. The songs were variously produced by Matthew Katz, Tommy Olive, Rick Jarrad, Al Schmitt, and Paul Kantner.

Track listing
"It's No Secret" (Marty Balin) – 2:40 from Jefferson Airplane Takes Off (1966) 
"Come Up the Years" (Balin, Paul Kantner) – 2:34 from Jefferson Airplane Takes Off
"My Best Friend" (Skip Spence) – 3:04 from Surrealistic Pillow (1967)
"Somebody to Love" (Darby Slick) – 3:00 from Surrealistic Pillow
"Comin' Back to Me" (Balin) – 5:23 from Surrealistic Pillow
"Embryonic Journey" (Jorma Kaukonen) – 1:55 from Surrealistic Pillow
"White Rabbit" (Grace Slick) – 2:34 from Surrealistic Pillow
"The Ballad of You and Me and Pooneil" (Kantner) – 4:34 from After Bathing at Baxter's (1967)
"Watch Her Ride" (Kantner) – 3:13 from After Bathing at Baxter's
"Crown of Creation" (Kantner) – 2:54 from Crown of Creation (1968)
"Greasy Heart" (Slick) – 3:27 from Crown of Creation
"Volunteers" (Balin, Kantner) – 2:04 from Volunteers (1969)

Personnel 
 Grace Slick – vocals; piano on "The Ballad of You and Me and Pooneil", "Greasy Heart" and "Volunteers" 
 Marty Balin – vocals 
 Paul Kantner – vocals, rhythm guitar 
 Jorma Kaukonen – lead guitars, vocals 
 Jack Casady – bass 
 Spencer Dryden – drums, percussion 
 Signe Toly Anderson – vocals on "It's No Secret" and "Come Up the Years"
 Skip Spence – drums on "It's No Secret" and "Come Up the Years"

Additional personnel
 Nicky Hopkins – piano on "Volunteers"

References

Jefferson Airplane compilation albums
2003 greatest hits albums